Nude Ants is a live album by American pianist Keith Jarrett which was released by ECM Records in 1980.  It was recorded during different live performances by Jarrett's 'European Quartet', featuring Jan Garbarek, Palle Danielsson and Jon Christensen, at the Village Vanguard in New York City in May 1979. The title of the album is a play on the phrase "New Dance", which is the title of the penultimate song.

Reception 
The Allmusic review by Scott Yanow awarded the album 4½ stars, stating, "The pianist very much dominates the music but Garbarek's unique floating tone on his instruments and the subtle accompaniment by Danielsson and Christensen are also noteworthy.".
The album is a persuasive illustration of Jarrett's typically refined work with European classical and folk music influences.

Track listing
All compositions by Keith Jarrett.

 "Chant of the Soil" - 17:13  
 "Innocence" - 8:15  
 "Processional" - 20:33  
 "Oasis" - 30:35  
 "New Dance" - 12:57  
 "Sunshine Song" - 12:03

Personnel
Keith Jarrett - piano, timbales, percussion
Jan Garbarek - tenor and soprano saxophones
Palle Danielsson - bass
Jon Christensen - drums

Production
 Manfred Eicher - producer
 Tom McKenney - recording engineer
 Martin Wieland - mixing engineer
 Barbara Wojirsch - cover design and layout

References 

Jan Garbarek live albums
Keith Jarrett live albums
1979 live albums
ECM Records live albums
Albums produced by Manfred Eicher
Albums recorded at the Village Vanguard